WRLZ (1160 AM) is a radio station broadcasting a Spanish language Christian format. Licensed to St. Cloud, Florida, United States, it serves the greater Orlando area. The station is currently owned by Iglesia el Calvario de Orlando, Inc., through licensee Radio Luz, Inc.

WRLZ has been granted an FCC construction permit to increase day power to 14,000 watts.

1160 AM is United States clear-channel frequency, on which KSL in Salt Lake City, Utah is the dominant Class A station.

References

External links

Radio stations established in 2009
2009 establishments in Florida
RLZ (AM)